Green Eyed Soul is the fifth studio album to be released by Lari White, and the first to be released on her own Skinny White Girl label. White began working on the songs for "Green Eyed Soul" while still signed as a country artist on Lyric Street Records. The soul and gospel flavored material was a departure from her country label origins, and she decided to release the album independently.

The album was originally released in Europe on May 10, 2004 by Mesmerizing Records. The U.S. release followed on July 26, 2005 on White's Skinny White Girl label in partnership with Emergent Music Marketing and RED Distribution.

Track listing
 "Nothing But Love" (Lari White, Kimmie Rhodes, Kevin Savigar) – 4:06
 "Let's Keep It Together" (White, Rick Neigher) – 5:08
 "Right Here Right Now" (White, Gary Nicholson) – 5:05
 "Eden Before the Fall" (White, Nicholson) – 4:27
 "Because I'm A Woman" (White) – 4:49
 "Groove w/ Me Baby" (White, Chuck Cannon, Jeffrey Steele) – 8:21
 "We Got It Goin' On" (White, Savigar) – 4:35
 "One More Time" (White, Travon Potts) – 4:21
 "Loved Right" (White, Cannon) – 5:13
 "High" (White, Paul Thorn, Billy Maddox) – 5:53
 "Bare" (White) – 3:00

Personnel
 Lari White — Vocals
 Michael Rhodes — Bass
 Dan Needham — Drums
 Tim Akers — Keys
 Jerry Mcpherson — Guitars
 Jim Horn — Saxophones and Flute
 Mike Haynes — Trumpet and Flugel Horn
 Barry Green — Trombone
 Connie Ellisor — Strings
 Frederick L. Vaughn — background vocal leader, background vocals
 Sherrie Kibble — background vocals
 Dana Dixon — background vocals
 Elissa N. Oats — background vocals
 Dion Jackson — background vocals
 Kimberly Mont — background vocals
 Nirva Dorsaint — background vocals
 Shandra Penix — background vocals

References

External links
 [ Green Eyed Soul] at Allmusic

2004 albums
Lari White albums
Albums produced by Lari White